The Galway Senior Football Championship is an annual Gaelic Athletic Association competition between the top Gaelic football clubs in Galway. The winners of the Galway Championship qualify to represent their county in the Connacht Senior Club Football Championship, the winners of which go on to the All-Ireland Senior Club Football Championship. The winning team is presented with the Frank Fox Cup.

Tuam Stars are the most successful with 25 wins. St. Grellan's, Ballinasloe hold the record for most consecutive championships, winning 8 from 1922 to 1929.

2018 saw the competition take on a new format, with group stages consisting of 4 groups of 5 teams.

Top winners

Roll of honour

References

External links
Official Galway Website
Galway on Hoganstand
Galway Club GAA

 
Galway GAA club championships
Gaelic football competitions in County Galway
Senior Gaelic football county championships